Shengang can refer to the following places:

China
 (申港街道), Jiangyin, Wuxi, Jiangsu
 (申港街道), Pudong, Shanghai

Taiwan
Shengang, Changhua (伸港鄉), a rural township in Changhua County
Shengang, Taichung (神岡區), a district of Taichung